Mendozite is a sulfate mineral, one of the alum series, with formula NaAl(SO4)2·11H2O. It is a hydrated form of sodium aluminium sulfate (soda alum).

It was discovered in western Argentina in 1868, probably near San Juan. The exact location has been lost, but was described as "San Juan, near Mendoza", and it is the latter city that give the mineral its name. It occurs in evaporites, presumably from the oxidation of sulfide minerals in the presence of clays. It is very soluble in water, and so can only be found in dry regions: however, in can still effloresce (lose water of crystallisation) in extremely arid climates, altering to tamarugite (the hexahydrate).

References

Bibliography
Palache, P.; Berman H.; Frondel, C. (1960). "Dana's System of Mineralogy, Volume II: Halides, Nitrates, Borates, Carbonates, Sulfates, Phosphates, Arsenates, Tungstates, Molybdates, Etc. (Seventh Edition)" John Wiley and Sons, Inc., New York, pp. 469-471.

Sodium minerals
Aluminium minerals
Sulfate minerals
Monoclinic minerals
Minerals in space group 15